The following is a list of George Foster Peabody Award winners and honorable mentions during the decade of the 2010s.

2010

2011

2012

2013

2014
Note: With the 2014 honorees, Peabody Award organizers began a practice of announcing each year's recipients by category rather than presenting them en masse.

2015
Note: Beginning in 2015, two notable changes were made in the Peabody Awards process:
 The in-advance announcement of finalists, from which the main juror panel would cull a list of formal award winners — "The Peabody 30".  Personal, institutional, and career achievement honorees do not count toward the "30" list.
 The introduction of the Futures of Media Awards, which highlight outstanding narratives and innovations in digital-based storytelling.  Futures of Media Award recipients are determined by a separate jury of Peabody program honor students at the University of Georgia's Grady College of Journalism and Mass Communication.

2016

2017

2018

2019
{|class="wikitable" style="width:95%"
|- style="background:#ccc;"
! style="width:35%;"| Recipient !! style="width:65%;"| Area of excellence
|-
!colspan="2"|Career achievement honors
|-
|Cicely Tyson
|Honored for being "a foundational figure in the advancement of meaningful programming and social change"
|-
!colspan="2"|Institutional honors
|-
|Frontline
|Honored for being "an unwavering source for truth through quality journalism when both are under attack"
|-
|The Simpsons
|Honored for being "one of the most consistently funny and culturally important satirical sitcoms over the last three decades"
|-
!colspan="2"|Entertainment honorees
|-
|HBO Miniseries and SKY in association with Sister, The Mighty Mint and Word Games
|Chernobyl
|-
|HBO Entertainment in association with Project Zeus, Hyperobject Industries and Gary Sanchez Productions
|Succession
|-
|HBO Entertainment in association with White Rabbit, Paramount, Warner Bros. Television and DC
|Watchmen
|-
|Page Fright and Outlier Productions in association with Warner Horizon Scripted Television
|David Makes Man
|-
|Apple/wiip/Anonymous Content/Tuning Fork Productions/Sugar 23 Productions
|Dickinson
|-
|All3Media International Limited and Amazon Studios
|Fleabag
|-
|A24 Television
|Ramy
|-
|Monkey Massacre Productions and 21 Laps Entertainment
|Stranger Things
|-
|Timberman-Beverly Productions, Sage Lane Productions, Escapist Fare, Katie Couric Media and CBS Television Studios for Netflix
|Unbelievable
|-
|Participant Media, Tribeca Productions, Harpo Films and Array Filmworks for Netflix
|When They See Us
|-
!colspan="2"|Documentary honorees
|-
|CNN Films
|Apollo 11
|-
|Frontline, Channel 4 News and ITN Productions
|For Sama
|-
|A production of Idiom Film, LLC and Louverture Films, in association with Field of Vision
|Hale County This Morning, This Evening
|-
|Fishbowl Films, Motto Pictures, 19340 Productions, Shark Island Institute, HHMI Tangled Bank Studios and IQ190 Productions{{small|(Airing on PBS' POV)}}
|Inventing Tomorrow|-
|Old Chilly Pictures LLC, American Documentary and Independent Television Service
|Midnight Traveler|-
|Final Cut for Real, Mouka Filmi, STORY, Bayerischer Rundfunk, Arte and American Documentary
|The Distant Barking of Dogs|-
|Semilla Verde Productions, Lucernam Films, American Documentary, ITVS, Latino Public Broadcasting and El Deseo
|The Silence of Others|-
|Bunim/Murray Productions and Kreativ Inc. for Lifetime
|Surviving R. Kelly|-
|A Busca Vida Filmes Production in association with Violet Films for Netflix
|The Edge of Democracy|-
|HBO Documentary Films and Kunhardt Films
|True Justice: Bryan Stevenson's Fight for Equality|-
!colspan="2"|Podcast/radio honorees|-
|OSM Audio and WNYC Studios
|Dolly Parton's America|-
|BBC Sounds/George the Poet Ltd.
|Have You Heard George's Podcast?|-
|American Public Media
|In the Dark: The Path Home, for its examination of Curtis Flowers' quadruple homicide case trials
|-
|Auricle Productions
|Threshold's third season The Refuge, which covers the controversy over drilling for oil in the Arctic National Wildlife Refuge and what's at stake if drilling does, or doesn't, happen. 
|-
!colspan="2"|News honorees|-
|NBC News
|Award for A Different Kind of Force: Policing Mental Illness, which covers how local police in San Antonio and Houston handle people with mental illness using empathy instead of violence
|-
|NBC News, Engel Unit
|Award for Richard Engel's reports on the cost of the United States's decision to abandon the Kurds
|-
|Newsday|Long Island Divided, an investigation into housing discrimination in the area and the impact it had on its towns and communities
|-
|CNN
|Award for a look at undocumented workers in the American Midwest and their positive impact on businesses and communities
|-
|WBBM-TV/Chicago, IL
|"Unwarranted", an investigation into botched police raids in Chicago and the impact they left on families and their homes
|-
!colspan="2"|Children's and youth honorees|-
|WGBH Educational Foundation and Atomic Cartoons
|Molly of Denali|}

Notes
1.In December 2020, The New York Times would return its Peabody for Caliphate after an internal investigation revealed that reportage included on the podcast, specifically one witness' unverifiable accounts of ISIS atrocities, did not adhere to the Times'' standards for accuracy.

References

 List2010